= Carbohydrate Polymers =

- Discipline: glycoscience
- Language: English

Publication details
- Publisher: Elsevier
- Open access: Yes
- Impact factor: 12.5 (2024)

Standard abbreviations
- ISO 4: Carbohydr. Polym.

Indexing
- ISSN: 0144-8617

Links
- Journal homepage; Online archive

Carbohydrate Polymers is a peer-reviewed scientific journal that covers the entire scope of carbohydrate polymers and the research and exploitation of polysaccharides. The journal is published by Elsevier.

== Abstracting and indexing ==
The journal is abstracted and indexed in several databases including:

- Science Citation Index
- Web of Science
- Polymer Contents

According to the Journal Citation Reports, the journal has a 2024 impact factor of 12.5.
